Raj Inter College is an intermediate college located in Rajesultanpur, Uttar Pradesh. It was established in 1990 by the Government of India.

Students
The college provides admission to female and male students after completion of 10+2 (intermediate) course work in different streams: Humanities, Science and Commerce. For the 2014–2015 academic year, the size of the student body is about 4,385, which comprised various sections of society.

References

External links
 Education Boards in India
 Board of High School and Intermediate Education Uttar Pradesh

Intermediate colleges in Uttar Pradesh
Education in Ambedkar Nagar district
Rajesultanpur
Educational institutions established in 1990
1990 establishments in Uttar Pradesh